Shijimia is a genus of butterflies in the family Lycaenidae. It is monotypic, containing only the species Shijimia moorei.

References 

Polyommatini
Lycaenidae genera
Taxa named by Shōnen Matsumura
Monotypic butterfly genera